The women's 68 kg competition in karate at the 2022 Mediterranean Games was held on 27 June at the Mohammed ben Ahmed CCO Hall 03 and 06 in Oran.

Results

Bracket

Repechage

References

W68
2022 in women's karate